Quercus delavayi is an Asian species of trees in the beech family. It has been found only in southern China, in the Provinces of Guizhou, Hubei, Sichuan, Yunnan, and Guangxi. It is placed in subgenus Cerris, section Cyclobalanopsis.

Quercus delavayi is a tree up to 20 meters tall with reddish-brown hairs covering the twigs and the undersides of the leaves, the leaves up to 12 cm long.

References

External links
line drawing, Flora of China Illustrations vol. 4, figure 389, drawing 4 at lower left

delavayi
Flora of China
Plants described in 1899